The Sullivan Tower was a high-rise building in Nashville, Tennessee, United States. It was built in 1940–1953, and demolished in 2018.

History
The Sullivan Tower was built between 1940 and 1953. It was part of the headquarters of the Southern Baptist Sunday School, later known as LifeWay Christian Resources, until November 2017, when the company moved to the Capitol View area.

The building was imploded by Southwest Value Partners, a real estate development company based in San Diego, California, on July 21, 2018. The developer is expected to develop part of the Nashville Yards where it stood.

Architectural significance
The building was designed in the Art Deco architectural style. In 2017, after requests from local preservationists, the Nashville Metro Historical Commission recommended its inclusion on the National Register of Historic Places, to no avail.

References

Office buildings completed in 1953
Buildings and structures demolished in 2018
Office buildings in Nashville, Tennessee
Art Deco architecture in Tennessee
Southern Baptist Convention
1953 establishments in Tennessee
2018 disestablishments in Tennessee